Nouamou is a town in southeastern Ivory Coast. It is a sub-prefecture of Tiapoum Department in Sud-Comoé Region, Comoé District.

Nouamou was a commune until March 2012, when it became one of 1126 communes nationwide that were abolished. 

In 2014, the population of the sub-prefecture of Nouamou was 19,148.

Villages
The nine villages of the sub-prefecture of Nouamou and their population in 2014 were:
 Attiékro  (1 182)
 Bléoulékro  (1 386)
 Dohouan  (1 391)
 Elokobabo  (566)
 Gaoussoukro  (4 103)
 Kotouagnoa  (4 355)
 Malamakro  (3 320)
 Nouamou  (2 135)
 Ouessèbo  (710)

References

Sub-prefectures of Sud-Comoé
Former communes of Ivory Coast